Franco Fasciana can refer to:

 Franco Fasciana (footballer, born 1960)
 Franco Fasciana (footballer, born 1990)